Chanel Simone Hudson-Marks (born September 14, 1997) is a Canadian-born Jamaican footballer who plays as a forward for the Jamaica women's national team.

Club career
In 2015, she played with the Woodbridge Strikers in League1 Ontario scoring 8 goals.

In 2016, she played for North Mississauga SC, scoring one goal in two appearances.

International career
Hudson-Marks represented Jamaica at the 2015 CONCACAF Women's U-20 Championship. She made her senior debut in a 1–0 friendly win against Chile on 28 February 2019.

International goals
Scores and results list Jamaica's goal tally first

Personal life
Hudson-Marks' cousin is Olympic gold-medalist Usain Bolt.

References 

1997 births
Living people
Citizens of Jamaica through descent
Jamaican women's footballers
Women's association football forwards
Women's association football midfielders
Memphis Tigers women's soccer players
Jamaica women's international footballers
2019 FIFA Women's World Cup players
Pan American Games competitors for Jamaica
Footballers at the 2019 Pan American Games
Jamaican expatriate women's footballers
Jamaican expatriate sportspeople in the United States
Expatriate women's soccer players in the United States
People from Pickering, Ontario
Soccer people from Ontario
Canadian women's soccer players
Black Canadian women's soccer players
Canadian sportspeople of Jamaican descent
Canadian expatriate soccer players
Canadian expatriate sportspeople in the United States
Woodbridge Strikers (women) players
League1 Ontario (women) players
North Mississauga SC (women) players